was a town located in Tōda District, Miyagi Prefecture, Japan.

In 2003, the town had an estimated population of 19,743 and a population density of 555.51 persons per km². The total area was 35.54 km².

History
On January 1, 2006, Kogota, along with the town of Nangō (also from Tōda District), was merged to create the town of Misato and no longer exists as an independent municipality.

Geography
The former town is situated in a rice growing area and serves as a shopping center for the surrounding area. The Naruse and Aikara rivers both flow through the former town.

Main sights
Major landmarks in the area include the Yamanokami Shrine and various ancient burial mounds dating from before 250BC.

Transport
Kogota Station connects the Tōhoku Main Line, Ishinomaki Line, and Rikuu East Line, all of the JR East railway network.

Twin towns
Kogota was a sister city of:
 Winona (Minnesota, USA).

References

External links
 Official website of Misato 

Dissolved municipalities of Miyagi Prefecture
Misato, Miyagi